Little Eye is a Scottish pop/rock solo artist from Glasgow. The band are perhaps best known for their singles "Fighting the Future" and "Choked Up". The band also featured in the 2014 Isle of Wight Festival, alongside the likes of the Red Hot Chili Peppers, The Waterboys, The Specials, Nina Nesbitt, John Newman and The 1975.

In November 2017, Little Eye announced that they would be splitting up 'due to creative differences'. Lead singer Allan Sieczkowski would carry on performing as a solo artist under the name 'Little Eye', while the other three band members are to work together to create a new project in 2018.

History
Little Eye were formed in 2008 by Glasgow born front man Allan Sieczkowski. The band were the 2009 winners of the "Clyde 1 In Demand Band of the Year Award". They released their first album Fighting the Future on 8 June 2014. The band have filmed a variety of session music videos, from New York City to Loch Lomond. The band also covered songs such as Paramore's "Monster", which gained popularity on the video-sharing website YouTube. The band released the single "Fighting the Future" on 17 April 2014. The song received positive reviews and reached number 22 on the iTunes alternative chart. The band also toured schools across the central belt of Scotland, in which they played a variety of their own songs and cover songs.

Members
 Allan Sieczkowski
 Jay Hepburn
 Euan Malloch

Discography

Albums
 Fighting the Future (2014)

Singles
 "Choked Up" (2013)
 "Fighting the Future" (2014)
 "End Game" (2014)
 "Contagious" (2016)

Awards
 Clyde 1 In Demand Band of the Year (2009)
 Young Scot Best Unsigned Band (2011)

References

Scottish rock music groups
Scottish pop music groups
Scottish boy bands
Musical groups established in 2008
Musical groups disestablished in 2017